Commercial Street is a street in San Francisco, California that runs from Sansome Street to Grant Avenue.

The eastern end of Commercial Street was originally the waterfront before it was filled in for real estate. It led to the Financial District and is the location of both the original San Francisco Mint, which is now the Pacific Heritage Museum, and the California headquarters for the Hudson's Bay Company.

It is one of only two streets in San Francisco oriented directly toward the tower of the Ferry Building (the other being Market Street).

Commercial Street is showcased in the 1950 film noir thriller, Woman on the Run, directed by Norman Foster. The location in particular is Sullivan's Grotto at 776 Commercial Street — the Commercial Street side entrance of Eastern Bakery at 720 Grant Avenue.

Parts of Commercial Street also contain circular designs of embedded brick taken from the street before the city paved the street. Photographer Benjamen Chinn lived on Commercial Street and played a part ensuring the street brick patterns remained so as to pay homage to its historical significance as part of Chinatown. 

Commercial street sign is also seen, while blurry, in the movie 'Big Trouble In Little China'.  It is near the alley that the "Lords Of Death" operate out of...in the movie.

References

 

Chinatown, San Francisco
Financial District, San Francisco
Streets in San Francisco